Danny Ormand is a retired State of Arkansas employee. He was previously the Fire Chief of Stamps, Arkansas and the County Sheriff of Lafayette County, He has since retired in 2012. He was the Deputy Director for the Arkansas Dept. of Emergency Management and had worked in Emergency Management for 14 years.

References
https://web.archive.org/web/20091124203856/http://www.acic.org/about/index.htm
http://www.acic.org/
http://www.fema.gov
Category:List of law enforcement agencies in Arkansas

Living people
People from Stamps, Arkansas
Year of birth missing (living people)
Place of birth missing (living people)